Labeobarbus longifilis is a species of ray-finned fish in the genus Labeobarbus from the upper Congo Basin in The Democratic Republic of the Congo.

References 

 

longifilis
Taxa named by Jacques Pellegrin
Fish described in 1935
Endemic fauna of the Democratic Republic of the Congo